Crochet lace is an application of the art of crochet. Generally it uses finer threads and more decorative styles of stitching, often with flowing lines or scalloped edges to give interest. Variation of the size of the holes also gives a piece a "lacy" look.

Originally crocheted lace was not regarded as true lace. Crocheting was considered an easy, and less time-consuming, but otherwise clearly inferior surrogate for "true" lace such as bobbin lace, needle lace or netting. The first examples of crocheted lace try to reproduce the products of other lacemaking techniques as faithfully as possible. Over time, the many possibilities and inherent beauty of crocheted lace became more widely appreciated.

Main styles of crocheted lace include filet crochet, Irish crochet and its modern derivatives, pineapple crochet. Freeform crocheted lace also exists, examples of which are pieces striving to imitate reticella lace.

Gallery

References